The Dalles Dam is a concrete-gravity run-of-the-river dam spanning the Columbia River, two miles (3 km) east of the city of The Dalles, Oregon, United States. It joins Wasco County, Oregon with Klickitat County, Washington, 300 miles (309 km) upriver from the mouth of the Columbia near Astoria, Oregon. The closest towns on the Washington side are Dallesport and Wishram.

The Army Corps of Engineers began work on the dam in 1952 and completed it five years later. Slack water created by the dam submerged Celilo Falls, the economic and cultural hub of Native Americans in the region and the oldest continuously inhabited settlement in North America. On March 10, 1957, hundreds of observers looked on as the rising waters rapidly silenced the falls, submerged fishing platforms, and consumed the village of Celilo.  Ancient petroglyphs were also in the area being submerged.  Approximately 40 petroglyph panels were removed with jackhammers before inundation and were placed in storage before being installed in Columbia Hills State Park in the 2000s.

The reservoir behind the dam is named Lake Celilo and runs 24 miles (39 km) up the river channel, to the foot of John Day Dam. The dam is operated by the U.S. Army Corps of Engineers (USACE), and the power is marketed by the Bonneville Power Administration (BPA). It is part of an extensive system of dams on the Columbia and Snake Rivers.

The Dalles Dam Visitor Center, in Seufert Park on the Oregon shore, was built in 1981. A tour train was closed in autumn 2001, partly due to post-September 11 security concerns, and partly due to deteriorating track conditions and a small derailment. The Columbia Hills State Park is nearby.

The Dalles Lock and Dam has been designated as a National Historic Civil Engineering Landmark by the American Society of Civil Engineers.

The Dalles Dam is one of the ten largest hydro power producing dams in the United States. Along with hydro power, the dam provides irrigation water, flood mitigation, navigation, and recreation.

Environmental Justice 

The loss of Celilo Falls and Celilo itself, and the Dalles Dam by extension is an environmental justice issue for several reasons. First and foremost, the losses and damages were much higher for a minority than anyone else. The Native Americans living in or near Celilo and fishing in the Falls lost a part of their culture and their way of life that relied on Celilo Falls. By damming the Columbia and flooding Celilo and Celilo Falls, the US Army Corps of Engineers caused far more issues for the Native Peoples than any other group. In many ways, the construction of the dam benefited many people by generating reliable energy and providing irrigation water for landowners and agriculturists at the expensive of the native peoples. The disproportionate impact on a minority is, in part, what makes the Dalles Dam an environmental justice issue.

Environmental justice refers to the idea that all people, regardless of race, ethnicity, religion, gender, sexual orientation, and ability should have the opportunity to live a happy and healthy life free of environmental toxins, hazards, or other negative things that could hurt one’s quality of life or well being. The Dalles Dam had a clear, observable negative impact on the native peoples of the mid-Columbia, making it an obvious environmental justice issue. Since The Dalles Dam provides such a significant amount of hydro power to the Pacific Northwest, the obvious solution of removing the dam not a sound choice for this issue. This means that other paths to restoring justice will need to be pursued by those who originally authorized and constructed the dam.

Before the dam was built and white settlers began to occupy the West, Celilo and Celilo Falls was a hub of inter tribal trading and fishing and sustained many Native Americans from various tribes, as well as the village of Celilo. Celilo Falls and the associated fishing activity was originally protected by a government treaty, but with the onset of the Cold War and the legacy of Bonneville Dam, completed in 1938, which served to power production during World War II, the US Army Corps of Engineers looked to develop another hydro power production facility on the Columbia River. The Dalles’ location on the mid-Columbia River below Celilo Falls made it an ideal hydro power production site and an ideal site for a run of the river dam. The Dalles Dam was authorized under the 1950 Flood Control Act. The Dalles Dam was not the first conflict the Native Peoples had with the United States government. For many years beforehand, Native Peoples had been contending with regulations and encroachment on their land by non-native people and government regulations on fishing. There is also a long history of discrimination and poor treatment of the Native Peoples at Celilo by non-native residents in the area. Federal funding to support Celilo or solve problems created by development in The Dalles was also in short supply. Celilo is not currently a part of any existing reservation.

Celilo Falls did more than simply provide a source of food for the peoples of the region. The area served as cultural and social center during salmon runs and a highly important trading center at which goods, foodstuffs, language and social customs were shared. Additionally, the area served as a spiritual monument as well, playing host to First Salmon ceremonies, during which people celebrated the end of winter and the beginning of the spring salmon run and honored the fish. These ceremonies have continued into modern times in Celilo with salmon brought in from afar, since it is now difficult to catch salmon where Celilo Falls used to be. On the bank on the Columbia River in Celilo, Oregon, sits a park, equipped with a boat launch and picnic areas. There is also a historical marker to memorialize the village of Celilo. On the Washington side of the Columbia River, there are also several parks.

While the government was technically required to honor an earlier treaty with the four tribes that relied on Celilo Falls that entitled them to continue all activities, including fishing, at the historic site of Celilo Falls and Celilo, when The Dalles Dam was authorized, the government was able to work around the treaty by paying the tribes a settlement. Some asked the US government to consider relocating the dam when it became clear that the dam would flood Celilo Falls, however, their requests never gained any traction. The US Army Corps of Engineers also failed to work with tribal officials to improve living conditions in Celilo for residents after the construction of the dam, despite having claimed they would do so. While there were efforts to relocate Native Americans living in Celilo when construction began on The Dalles Dam, the process was convoluted, and the funding was lacking. In the end, very few families chose to move to New Celilo and most ended up moving to their reservations, the Dalles, or other places in Oregon or Washington. Settlements were made with Native People as compensation for the loss of traditional fishing grounds

Salmon 
The Dalles Dam was extremely damaging to the salmon runs in the Columbia River. The physical dam made it difficult for fish to navigate the river and get upstream to their spawning grounds. Even with the installation of fish ladders, salmon populations struggled. This is impactful for a number of reasons, most notably for the native peoples in Columbia River Basin. Native peoples have lost the ability to fish for both income and food, and a location that has great historical significance to their people. Additionally, salmon have great cultural importance to many tribes in the Pacific Northwest and with declining salmon populations upriver, people have begun to lose important parts of their culture. Data does, however, suggest that dam removal could allow populations of all fish, not just salmon re-establish themselves and revive aquatic ecosystems. Even so, removing a dam like the Dalles Dam, which provides large amounts of hydroelectric energy and makes the Columbia River navigable for ships, is highly unlikely to happen any time soon.

US Army Corps of Engineers 
The US Army Corps of Engineers had been working on The Dalles Lock & Dam Tribal Housing Village Development Plan. This plan is designed to find a location for and construct a village for members of the tribes that historically relied on Celilo Falls for fishing. The Village Development Plan had been slated to be finished by fall of 2020, however, there is no indication that this was completed. In 2017, various senators from the states of Oregon and Washington signed a letter to the Director of the Office of Management and Budget, expressing concern about the Office’s plan to halt this project. No information about the fate of this letter is available.

In 2007, the US Army Corps of Engineers conducted a sonar survey of the site of Celilo Falls, after Col. Thomas O’Donovan, the then Portland district commander, was distraught when he heard rumors among locals that the site of the falls had been blown up and destroyed when the dam was constructed, and ordered that a survey of the riverbed be conducted. The survey found that the geological features on the riverbed match those that can be observed in photos of Celilo Falls prior to the construction of the dam. This means that form the Falls still exist on the riverbed, without so much as a sediment build up. If the Dalles Dam were removed from the Columbia River, it is highly likely that Celilo Falls would return. The Dalles Dam is involved in ongoing conversations about removing dams on the Columbia and Snake Rivers, but unlikely to be slated for removal any time soon.

Specifications 

 Height:  (Lake Celilo normal pool elevation )
 Length: 
 Navigation lock:
 Single-lift
  wide
  long
 Powerhouse:
 Length: 
 Fourteen 94,400 kilowatt units
 Eight 104,000 kilowatt units
 Total capacity: 1,878.3 megawatts
 Overload capacity: 2,160 MW
 Spillway:
 Gates: 23
 Length: 
 Capacity:

Gallery

See also

List of dams in the Columbia River watershed
 List of largest hydroelectric power stations in the United States

References

External links

 The Dalles Lock & Dam - The U.S. Army Corps of Engineers
 "The Dalles Dam to Submerge Famous Indian Fishing Spot." Popular Mechanics, April 1956, pp. 138–140.

Columbia River Gorge
Dams in Oregon
Dams in Washington (state)
Dams on the Columbia River
Hydroelectric power plants in Washington (state)
Hydroelectric power plants in Oregon
Buildings and structures in Klickitat County, Washington
Buildings and structures in The Dalles, Oregon
Run-of-the-river power stations
Tourist attractions in Wasco County, Oregon
United States Army Corps of Engineers dams
Dams completed in 1957
Energy infrastructure completed in 1957
1957 establishments in Oregon
Gravity dams
Articles containing video clips
1957 establishments in Washington (state)
Historic Civil Engineering Landmarks